Jakob Friis-Hansen (born 6 March 1967) is a Danish former professional footballer who played as a defender. At club level, he spent most of his career with French club Lille OSC. For the Denmark national team, he made 19 appearances.

He is an old friend of former England forward Teddy Sheringham.

He was formerly a scout for Liverpool F.C., and worked as Director of the European Recruitment for Southampton between 2011 and 2012.

References

External links
 Danish national team profile 
 

1967 births
Living people
Danish men's footballers
Denmark international footballers
Denmark under-21 international footballers
Association football defenders
Lyngby Boldklub players
Ligue 1 players
Lille OSC players
FC Girondins de Bordeaux players
Hamburger SV players
Bundesliga players
1995 King Fahd Cup players
FIFA Confederations Cup-winning players
Danish football managers
Fremad Amager managers
Danish expatriate men's footballers
Expatriate footballers in France
Expatriate footballers in Germany
Hellerup IK managers
Footballers from Copenhagen